Zinna is a village and a former municipality in the district Nordsachsen, in Saxony, Germany. Since 1 January 2013, it is part of the town Torgau.

See also 
 Treaty of Zinna
 Zinna Abbey

References 

Former municipalities in Saxony
Torgau